London Buses route 436 is a Transport for London contracted bus route in London, England. Running between Lewisham and Battersea Park station, it is operated by London Central.

History

Route 436 was introduced on 8 February 2003 when route 36 Queen's Park to Lewisham was curtailed to New Cross Gate. These changes were made in preparation for the introduction of the London congestion charge. Operated by London Central's New Cross garage, it was the third route in London (after Red Arrow routes 507 and 521) to be operated by articulated buses.

In March 2004 a bus on 436 caught fire on Park Lane, this was the third fire in as many months and the whole Mercedes-Benz O530G fleet, was subsequently withdrawn, and route 436 was suspended. Extra buses were run on route 36, with limited services operated on route 436 with double-deck buses. After a short period time modifications were made to the O530G fleet.

On 19 November 2011, route 436 was retained by London Central and was converted to double deck operation with Alexander Dennis Enviro400Hs and Alexander Dennis Enviro400s as part of the Mayor of London's policy to replace the O530Gs. The route was one of the final three in London to use articulated buses, their withdrawal was criticised due to the resulting reduction in capacity. They were phased out in an attempt to reduce fare evasion. The former vehicles now operate in Brighton and Hove.

In late 2016, the route was altered west of Vauxhall bus station to terminate at Battersea Park station instead of Paddington station.

Current route
Route 436 operates via these primary locations:
Lewisham Lewisham Centre
Lewisham station  
New Cross station  
New Cross Gate station  
Queens Road Peckham station  
Peckham High Road
Camberwell Green
Oval station 
Vauxhall bus station  for Vauxhall station  
St George Wharf
United States Embassy
Battersea Power Station tube station 
Battersea Park station

References

External links

Bus routes in London
Transport in the London Borough of Lambeth
Transport in the London Borough of Lewisham
Transport in the London Borough of Southwark
Transport in the City of Westminster